Progrès Niederkorn vs Rangers was a football match played on 4 July 2017 at the Stade Josy Barthel. The match was a UEFA Europa League first qualifying round tie between Luxembourgian minnows Progrès Niederkorn, who finished fourth in the 2016–17 National Division, and Scottish side Rangers, who finished third in the 2016–17 Scottish Premiership.

At the time, the Luxembourg National Division was among the lowest ranked football leagues in terms of their UEFA coefficient. In addition, Progrès had only ever scored one goal and had never before won a game in European competition in their 100-year history. In contrast, Rangers have a proud history of success in Europe, they won the 1971–72 European Cup Winners' Cup and finished runners up in the 1961 and 1967 finals of the same competition, they also finished as runners-up in the 2007–08 UEFA Cup.

The result, 2–0 to Progrès, is considered by some media outlets as "humiliating" for Rangers and was described as "the worst result in the club's history". It sent Rangers out of European competition for another year, having not qualified in the previous six years since the club's liquidation in 2012.

Build-up
Led by French manager Thomas Gilgemann, Niederkorn finished fourth in the 2016–17 Luxembourg National Division and thus qualified for the first qualifying round of the UEFA Europa League. In 2006, Niederkorn were promoted from the Division of Honour to the Luxembourgian top flight, the club initially struggled and had to face the relegation playoffs in the 2012–13 season. However, they saw success in the subsequent years. They qualified for the 2015–16 Europa League for the first time since 1982 by finishing fourth but succumbed to a 3–0 defeat on aggregate to Shamrock Rovers in the first qualifying round. Niederkorn repeated that league success of the previous year in 2016–17 by finishing fourth which again placed them in the first qualifying round of the Europa League, this time they were drawn against Rangers.

On 13 March 2017, Rangers assigned Portuguese national Pedro Caixinha to the role of manager after the club finished third in the 2016–17 Scottish Premiership, which qualified them for the Europa League. The 2016–17 season was Rangers' first season back in the Scottish Premier League after being sent to the lowest tier of the Scottish football league system, the Third Division (now known as League Two), for the 2012–13 season as they entered into administration. The club hadn't qualified for European competition in six years.

On 29 June 2017, Rangers won the first leg of their tie against Progrès Niederkorn 1–0 at Ibrox, and went into the game with high hopes.

Match

Ranger's starting eleven contained Caixinha's new signings Daniel Candeias, Alfredo Morelos and Fábio Cardoso, and also saw Ryan Jack receive his debut.

The visitors saw the most of the ball in the early stages of the game but couldn't find a way past the defence of Niederkorn. Rangers striker Kenny Miller, who scored the goal in the reverse leg, saw his shot blocked, and that was the closest Rangers came to a goal in the first half. The sides went in for the half time interval with the score remaining level.

The deadlock was almost broken by Rangers with a Niko Kranjčar header which came back off the crossbar, but it was Progrès that initiated the scoring. In the 66th minute, Rangers conceded a free-kick in a threatening position. It proved decisive as Emmanuel Françoise headed in the opening goal and scored the clubs first European goal since a 1–1 draw against Glentoran F.C. in 1981, 36 years prior.

Progrès then doubled their lead on the night and took the lead on aggregate in the 75th minute from another free-kick. Sébastien Thill curled in a free kick which evaded everyone and crept in at the far post.

Rangers failed to score a vital away goal which would send them through, despite hitting the bar twice, and Progrès secured their first win in European competition in their 100-year history.

Details

Aftermath

Rangers

After the defeat, Scottish media outlets regarded the match as one of the most embarrassing defeats in the history of Rangers, the history of Scottish football, and one of the greatest shocks in European football. The BBC described the match as "humiliating" for Rangers, and the Daily Record dubbed it "a horror show", before adding "a utterly horrific result".

After that disappointing start to the season, Rangers' form did not improve. Notable results include a 2–0 defeat to Celtic at home in the league and defeat to Motherwell in the Scottish League Cup semi-final by the same scoreline. On 26 October, a day after a 95th-minute equaliser at Ibrox by last-placed Kilmarnock saw Rangers draw 1–1, Caixinha was sacked and Graeme Murty took over as caretaker manager for the second time. The Portuguese manager's reign was the shortest ever in the club's history, only serving 229 days in charge. It was described as "a desperate mess from start to finish".

Progrès Niederkorn
In the second qualifying round, Progrès Niederkorn played Cypriot side AEL Limassol and were eliminated 3–1 on aggregate, losing both legs. AEL Limassol only survived to the next round, where they were defeated by Austria Wien.

2018–19
Both clubs qualified for the Europa League again the following season, after Progrès Niederkorn improved their domestic league position from 4th to 2nd in the 2017–18 Luxembourg National Division and Rangers again finished 3rd in the 2017–18 Scottish Premiership. They each defeated two opponents to reach the third qualifying round, with the advance draw for the subsequent Play-off round pairing them up again should both make it through; However, while Rangers did advance, Progrès were narrowly defeated by Russian club FC Ufa; the Luxembourgers had already achieved their best-ever outcome in European competitions by winning the two prior rounds. Rangers went on to defeat FC Ufa in the Play-off round and thus qualified for the group stages of the Europa League.

2019–20
Both clubs qualified for the 2019–20 UEFA Europa League and were drawn to face each other again, this time in the second qualifying round, both having navigated the first round. Rangers won the tie and advanced with a 2–0 victory in Scotland and a 0–0 draw in Luxembourg.

See also
 Lincoln Red Imps 1–0 Celtic

References

2017–18 UEFA Europa League
FC Progrès Niederkorn 2-0 Rangers (2017)
2017–18 in Scottish football
2017–18 in Luxembourgian football
Association football matches in Europe
July 2017 sports events in Europe